KMCI-TV (channel 38) is an independent television station licensed to Lawrence, Kansas, United States, serving the Kansas City metropolitan area. It is owned by the E. W. Scripps Company alongside NBC affiliate KSHB-TV (channel 41). Both stations share studios on Oak Street in Kansas City, Missouri, while KMCI-TV's transmitter is located at the Blue River Greenway in the city's Hillcrest section. Despite Lawrence being KMCI-TV's city of license, the station maintains no physical presence there.

History
The station first signed on the air on February 1, 1988. Founded by Miller Broadcasting, it originally served as an affiliate of the Home Shopping Network (HSN).

In March 1996, KSHB owner Scripps Howard Broadcasting reached a deal to manage KMCI under a local marketing agreement. That August, KMCI then dropped much of its home shopping programming and rebranded as "38 Family Greats", with a family-oriented general entertainment format from 6:00 a.m. to midnight, with HSN programming being relegated to the overnight hours. The new KMCI lineup included an inventory of programs that KSHB owned but had not had time to air after it switched to NBC in 1994.

Exercising an option from the 1996 pact with Miller, Scripps bought KMCI outright for $14.6 million in 2000, forming a legal duopoly with KSHB. In 2002, KMCI dropped the "Family Greats" branding and simply branded by its channel number. In July 2003, coinciding with the move of its transmitter site from Lawrence toward Kansas City, the station officially became known as "38 the Spot".

Programming
Syndicated programs broadcast on KMCI as of September 2020 include Mike & Molly, Last Man Standing, Family Guy, Divorce Court and 2 Broke Girls, among others. KMCI features hosts that promote the station's programming, as well as local events during commercial breaks. Taunia Hottman was the first spokesperson for KMCI as "38 the Spot". Meredith Hoenes (who became a traffic reporter for KSHB-TV around this time) replaced Hottman after she left in 2004 to join KUSA in Denver. Holly Starr took over after Hoenes left in February 2008 to become a weekday anchor/reporter for WDAF-TV; Starr remained with KMCI as its program host until 2011, replaced by Crystle Lampitt in 2012.

During the COVID-19 pandemic and school closures in 2020, Scripps partnered with Kansas City Public Schools to air a daily program, KCPS Homeroom, produced by the school district for its students on KMCI.

Sports programming
Currently, KMCI simulcasts an hour of the Border Patrol morning show on sports radio station WHB (810 AM). Along with KSHB-TV, it is an official station of the Kansas City Chiefs.

Shortly after becoming 38 The Spot, the station launched a sports talk show, 38 Sports Spot, which ran from 2003 to 2008. For much of that time period, the station also had rights to a package of Kansas City Royals baseball games.

On November 6, 2013, KSHB-TV/KMCI-TV announced a deal with Sporting Kansas City to broadcast up to 26 regular season games from the Major League Soccer club on KMCI, as well as several specials throughout the season (some of which will air on KSHB-TV) and pre-game and post-game shows beginning with the 2014 season. The deal ran through 2016; beginning in 2017, all Sporting KC matches moved to Fox Sports Kansas City. For the 2022 season, Sporting KC returned to KMCI.

In 2018, KMCI and the University of Kansas struck a deal where KMCI would broadcast one early-season football game and several early-season Kansas Jayhawks men's basketball games, women's basketball home games, and other select sporting events from the university. The move was part of expanded distribution of the university's Tier 3 athletic events.

The Kansas City Chiefs announced in 2019 that KMCI and KSHB would replace KCTV as the team's official broadcast partners, allowing access to team programming, including preseason contests, plus marketing opportunities.

Newscasts
In 2000, KSHB-TV began producing a half-hour 9:00 p.m. newscast on KMCI to compete with the in-house newscast in that timeslot on WDAF-TV. The program was canceled in 2003, one week after KMCI's rebranding as "38 The Spot"; by this point, the newscast was called 38 News Now and had completely differentiated itself from KSHB's newscasts, using different presentation and a smaller set.

On August 1, 2011, KMCI began airing a rebroadcast of KSHB's 11:00 a.m. newscast at noon on weekdays. In addition to airing rebroadcasts of local news programming from KSHB-TV, KMCI will take on the responsibility of preempting regular programming and running NBC network shows in the event of extended breaking news or severe weather coverage on KSHB.

On April 6, 2015, KMCI began airing a 3rd hour of KSHB 41 News Today from 7 to 8 a.m., after KSHB begins airing NBC's Today show.

On July 5, 2022, KMCI began airing an original local newscast at noon, branded as KSHB 41 News at Noon on 38 the Spot.

Technical information

Subchannels
The station's ATSC 1.0 channels are carried on the multiplexed digital signals of other Kansas City television stations:

Live Well Network was originally intended to be carried on KSHB digital subchannel 41.3, but was added to KMCI 38.2 on September 1, 2011 instead to even out the bandwidth between both stations. KMCI replaced the Live Well Network with Bounce TV on digital subchannel 38.2 on October 21, 2013. KMCI also added Escape to 38.3 and Grit on 38.4 on April 15, 2015.  Escape was rebranded as Ion Mystery on digital subchannel 38.3 on September 30, 2019. Grit was replaced with Court TV on digital subchannel 38.4 by the end of January 2020, only for that to be replaced by HSN in March 2021. (The Court TV affiliation is now on the third subchannel of WDAF-TV and the second subchannel of KPXE-TV.)

Analog-to-digital conversion
KMCI-TV shut down its analog signal, over UHF channel 38, on June 12, 2009, the official date in which full-power television stations in the United States transitioned from analog to digital broadcasts under federal mandate. The station's digital signal moved from its pre-transition UHF channel 36 to channel 41 (the former analog-era assignment and current virtual channel of sister station KSHB-TV) for post-transition operations. Through the use of PSIP, digital television receivers display the station's virtual channel as its former UHF analog channel 38. As part of the FCC's repack, KMCI-TV moved to channel 25 on February 11, 2019.

ATSC 3.0

On August 24, 2021, at 10 a.m., KMCI-TV turned off its ATSC 1.0 signal and activated its ATSC 3.0 transmitter on UHF 25. The station's ATSC 1.0 subchannels were moved to other broadcasters for simulcasting, while KMCI became the host for the new ATSC 3.0 signals of WDAF-TV, KCPT, KMCI-TV and KSHB-TV.

As for KMCI's subchannels, KMCI 38.1 and 38.2 were moved to sister station KSHB-TV, while 38.3 and 38.4 were moved to WDAF-TV.

References

External links
 
 KSHB-TV website

Independent television stations in the United States
Bounce TV affiliates
Ion Mystery affiliates
Television stations in the Kansas City metropolitan area
E. W. Scripps Company television stations
Television channels and stations established in 1988
1988 establishments in Kansas
Lawrence, Kansas
Television stations in Kansas
Sporting Kansas City broadcasters
Major League Soccer over-the-air television broadcasters
ATSC 3.0 television stations